The men's individual competition of the Golf events at the 2019 Pan American Games was held between August 8 and 11 at the Country Club Villa in Lima, Peru.

Fabrizio Zanotti won the gold medal for Paraguay, its first gold medal in the Pan American Games.

Schedule
All times are PET (UTC−5).

Results
The final results were:

(a) denotes an amateur

The medals were determined in a sudden-death playoff. Zanotti won the gold on the first extra hole while Toledo took the silver on the 11th extra hole.

References

Golf at the 2019 Pan American Games